Sudden Death is a comedy rap trio from Hardyston Township, New Jersey consisting of members Tom Rockwell ("Devo Spice"), Steve Fernino ("Piles"), and Thom Uliasz ("Professor Pastronamy").

They formed in 1986 and started releasing their music in 1991.

Sudden Death has landed Dr. Demento's Funny #1 of the year three times.  In 2002, while being featured with The great Luke Ski, they held #1 of the year with "Peter Parker".  In 2005, they shared the top spot with Worm Quartet for the song "Inner Voice". In 2007 they made history by having the top spot with "Cellular Degeneration," number two with "Getting Old Sucks," number four with "Pillagers," and guest vocals on number five with Seamonkey's "Anorexiac."

Sudden Death is one of the founding members of The FuMP, The Funny Music Project.

On October 10, 2008, Rockwell announced that the "Sudden Death" name is being retired.  All subsequent tracks will be released as solo performances under Rockwell's stage name.

Discography
Dead Things Can Rap Too (1991)
Noise Pollution (1993)
Brain Damage (1994, EP)
Brain Dead (1995)
A Decade of Decay (1996, compilation)
Unplugged (1998)
Fatal Accident Zone (2002)
Die Laughing (2005)
Fatal Error (2008)
Rhythms from the Crypt: The Best of Sudden Death (2013, compilation)

External links
Devo Spice official website
Sudden Death Fansite

American comedy musical groups
People from Hardyston Township, New Jersey